José Luis Abadín Iglesias (born 13 March 1986 in Ourense) is a Spanish racing driver who competed in the FIA Formula Two Championship.

Racing record

Career summary

Complete FIA Formula Two Championship results
(key) (Races in bold indicate pole position) (Races in italics indicate fastest lap)

Notes

References

External links 
 

1987 births
Living people
Sportspeople from Ourense
Spanish racing drivers
Euroformula Open Championship drivers
FIA Formula Two Championship drivers
MRF Challenge Formula 2000 Championship drivers